The triplewart seadevil (Cryptopsaras couesii) is a sea devil of the family Ceratiidae and the order Lophoiiformes. This species is the only member of its genus. Noted for its extreme sexual dimorphism, the triplewart seadevil's length ranges from 20 to 30 cm for females and 1 to 3 cm for males.

Distribution 
Triplewart seadevils are ceratioids commonly found worldwide in all major oceans. They are seen in depths ranging from 75 to 4000 m (250 to 13,100 ft), with the majority of specimens found in the mesopelagic and bathypelagic zones between 500 and 1250 m (1600 to 4100 ft). It is dispersed from the deep ocean to shallower water because its weak swimming power allows it to be carried over long distances by ocean currents.

Morphology 
Female triplewart seadevils have a laterally compressed, elongated body with a large head and a mouth that is nearly vertical when closed. It has 2 to 3 rows of irregular depressible teeth, with significantly larger teeth on the lower jaw than the smaller upper jaw. The body is covered by deeply embedded hollow spines. Only the tips show and there are no conical bone plates. The 3 lateral caruncles have club-shaped glands that secrete a slime containing luminous granules. Adult females have jet-black pigmentation while juveniles are dark brown. The triplewart seadevil uses an illicium, a modified dorsal spine on the snout, to lure prey. This apparatus is primarily composed of a terminating esca or lure supported by an extremely long pterygiophore bone encased in a dermal sheath. Winding muscles control the anterior and posterior movement of the bone, suggesting extension and retraction by rotation. The terminal esca contains bioluminescent bacterial symbionts, creating a glowing lure for their prey.

Sexual dimorphism
The species displays extreme sexual dimorphism, where dwarfed males parasitize the larger females. Their specialized jaw has an anterior pair of denticular teeth that are longer than their posterior pair. Males permanently attach themselves to the ventral side of females with this specialized jaw meant for grasping a female mate. Once attached, tissue fusion occurs, permanently binding the mouth and one side of the male to the surface of the female. After attachment, the male becomes dependent on the female for blood-circulated nutrients due to the fusion of the circulatory and digestive systems. This case of extreme sexual dimorphism is favored by natural selection due to the random dispersal of individuals. If one of the relatively numerous males is fortunate enough to encounter a female, it attaches for the remainder of its life. This significantly increases the chance of reproduction for the individual and therefore increases its fitness.

Reproduction 

Female triplewart seadevils are receptive to parasitic males at a young age. Once past metamorphosis, sexual parasitism may occur at almost any size (as small as 15 mm.) Despite this, the percentage of reproducing individuals is small. Of 600 metamorphosed females studied, only 6.2% were parasitized. Spawning events occur more than once a year, and the Atlantic Ocean contains triplewart seadevil larvae for most of the year, with summer having the greatest occurrences. The seadevil's method of sexual parasitism leads to the female to be akin to a self-fertilizing hermaphrodite. This is due to the nature of tissue fusion between mates and the continuous production of sperm by the male. Unlike all other ceratioids, males do not have large nostrils for tracking species-specific pheromones emitted by the female. Instead, they have large eyes that degenerate upon attachment to the female.

References

External links

Ceratiidae
Fish described in 1883
Taxa named by Theodore Gill